Radhika and Dudhika Nayak (born 1888; Dudhika died on February 16, 1902; Radhika died in November 1903) were Indian conjoined twin sisters. They toured Europe and North America as "the Orissa Twins", sideshow performers with the Barnum and Bailey Circus. (Their names were spelled various ways in reports, over time and across languages.)

Early life
Radhika and Dudhika were born in the Dhenkanal district of Odisha, probably in Huapada, the children of Khestra Nayak. They were taken into the care of a local religious community as infants.

Sideshow career
The girls were removed from the sadhus' care by an English promoter called Captain Coleman, and they sailed for Europe with him in 1892. Their first public exhibition outside of India was at the Royal Aquarium in London. In 1893 they traveled to the United States, where they were displayed at the World's Columbian Exposition in Chicago that year. Also in 1893, the British Medical Journal published a report about their physical state, finding them "free from all element of repulsiveness" and "apparently perfect in every respect, except that from the ensiform cartilage to the umbilicus they are united together." Another medical journal reported that "the children seldom quarrel". After their Chicago appearance, the Orissa Twins toured extensively with the Barnum and Bailey Circus sideshow. They were said to speak English, French, and German, and to have a Scottish governess.

Separation and deaths
The twins had been traveling for almost a decade when Dudhika was found to have tuberculosis in 1902. A prominent French doctor, Eugène-Louis Doyen, offered to perform a surgical separation in hopes of saving Radhika's health. The surgery was filmed (as other procedures by Doyen had been). There was concern afterward that the surgeon had been distracted or hasty, because of the cameras and his ambition for good publicity. "The practice of medical heroics on Radica and Doodica's bodies," comments a recent historian, "can be understood as the spectacularization of medical superiority."

Dudhika Nayak died soon after of the surgery, aged about 14 years, from peritonitis. Radhika Nayak recovered well, and was not told of her sister's death; Radhika was baptized as Marie Marguerite, and learned needlework, during her stay in a Paris sanitorium. She died in 1903, aged about 15 years, from tuberculosis.

After their separation, the film of the procedure made its way into theatres, first for medical professionals, but eventually to a wider audience. There was "a storm of disgust" when the film was exhibited in Vienna in 1903. Doyen himself tried to stop the exhibition of the films in sideshows in 1904.

Legacy
In 2017, conjoined twin boys Jaga and Kalia Kanhar, also from Odisha, were successfully separated by surgery in New Delhi. Radhika and Dudhika Nayak were recalled in some articles about the event.

References

External links
 "The Orissa Twins. Radica, Doodica & Prins Colibri" a Danish cabinet card in the collection of the J. Paul Getty Museum.

1888 births
1902 deaths
1903 deaths
Conjoined twins
Sideshow performers